Andapuram is a village on the banks of Uppar river, in the Namakkal district of the Indian state of Tamil Nadu. Andapuram is a Gram Panchayat, falling in the Mohanur Revenue Block, Namakkal Taluk. Andapuram is in the Namakkal Assembly constituency and Namakkal Parliamentary constituency of India.

Location

Education
The following educational institutions are present in Andapuram:
 Government High School
 Salem Co-operative Sugar Mills Polytechnic College, Mohanur
Vetri vidhyalaya matriculation school
Panchayat union elementary  school

Hospitals
The nearest health care facilities are in Alampatti, a village  from Andapuram.

1.Primary health center  Alampatti

2.Primary health  center Murungai

Temples
Temples located in Andapuram include the following:
 Chellayi Amman Temple
 Pillaiyar Temples
 Mariamman Temple
 Arasamarathu Temple
 Perumal Temple
 Shivan Temple

See also
 Namakkal (Lok Sabha constituency)
 Namakkal District
Andapuram lake

References

Villages in Namakkal district